Glasgow is a city located on the banks of the River Clyde, in West Central Scotland.

Climate

Glasgow weather is typical of Scottish weather and often unpredictable.

The summer months (May to September) can be fine and sunny and mild. The winds are generally westerly, due to warm Gulf Stream. The warmest month, on average is July, averaging over 20 °C. However it can be very changeable, and normally a few degrees colder than southern England. Mornings can be damp and misty, or "dreich" (a Scottish word for damp and drizzly) and by afternoon sunny and warm.

Spring (March to May) is fairly mild and is a popular time to visit Glasgow. Though some days are rainy and windy, Many of Glasgow's trees begin to flower at this time of the year and Glasgow's parks and gardens are filled with spring colour.

Winters in Glasgow can be long and damp with fewer sunny days (though surprisingly warmer than other countries on the same latitude as Glasgow due to the effects of the Gulf Stream). The winds can be chilling and cold, though severe snow is infrequent and doesn't last too long. December, January and February are the wettest months of the year, though can be sunny if not warm.

Statistics

Demographics

Population density
Glasgow's population peaked in 1931 at 1,088,000, and for over 40 years remained over 1 million. However, in the 1960s the population started to decline, partly due to relocation to the "new towns" in clearings of the poverty-stricken inner city areas like the Gorbals. In addition, successive boundary changes reduced the official city boundaries (and hence its official population) making direct comparisons difficult as the city expands beyond the local council boundaries.

Historical population

Source: 2001 Census

Current statistics
Due to council boundary changes since the 1991 census, Greater Glasgow has four distinct definitions for the population of Glasgow in the 2001 Census: the smallest is the new Glasgow City Council Area (which lost the district of Rutherglen to South Lanarkshire in 1996), the Greater Glasgow Health Board area (covered by the local NHS Trust), the City of Glasgow Locality Area (formerly Glasgow District Council Area) and the Greater Glasgow Metropolitan Settlement Area (including surrounding localities).

Source 2001 Census

Since the 2001 census the population decline has stabilised. The 2004 population of the city council area was 585,090 and the population of both the City of Glasgow Council area and Greater Glasgow are forecast to grow in the near future. Around 2,300,000 people live in the Greater Glasgow conurbation, defined as the City of Glasgow and the surrounding region.

Compared to Inner London (22,438 people per square mile), Scotland's major city has less than half the current population density of the English capital (8,528). However, in 1931 the population density was 16,011, highlighting the subsequent "clearances" to the suburbs and new towns that were built to empty one of Europe's most densely populated cities.

Notes

The official population of Glasgow City Council unitary authority.
The City of Glasgow locality, as defined by the 2001 Census. Localities are sub-divisions of 2001 Settlements that are based on 1991 Locality boundaries. 
The Greater Glasgow Settlement Area or Metropolitan Area was created from groups of neighbouring urban postcodes grouped so that each group of postcode unit contains at least a given number of addresses per hectare and the group contains at least 500 residents and includes the following localities: Airdrie, Bargeddie, Barrhead, Bellshill, Bishopbriggs, Bothwell, Busby, Calderbank, Carfin, Chapelhall, Clarkston, Clydebank, Coatbridge, Duntocher and Hardgate, Elderslie, Faifley, Giffnock, Glasgow, Holytown, Howwood, Johnstone, Kilbarchan, Linwood, Milngavie, Milton, Motherwell, New Stevenston, Newarthill, Newmains, Newton Mearns, Old Kilpatrick, Paisley, Renfrew, Stepps, Uddingston Viewpark and Wishaw.

References